Allan Hall may refer to:
Alan Hall (1952–2015), British cell biologist, best known for studying the role of Ras superfamily proteins in cancer
Allen Hall (billiards player) World championship finalist in 1931
Allan Hall (journalist) (1929–2001), British journalist
Allan Hall (footballer) (1908–1983), English footballer
Allan Hall, Contemporary Christian music artist, founding member of Selah, pianist and singer

See also

Allen Hall (disambiguation)